The 2014–15 All-Ireland Senior Club Hurling Championship was the 45th staging of the All-Ireland championship since its establishment in 1970. The championship began on 12 October 2014 and ended on 17 March 2015.

Portumna were the defending champions.

Ballyhale Shamrocks won the title after a 1-18 to 1-6 win against Kilmallock in the final.

Team summaries

Participating clubs

Fixtures and results

Leinster Senior Club Hurling Championship

Munster Senior Club Hurling Championship

Ulster Senior Club Hurling Championship

All-Ireland Senior Club Hurling Championship

Championship statistics

Miscellaneous

 The Munster quarter-final between Ballygunner and Cratloe is their second ever meeting in the history of the championship. A win for Cratloe results in the club securing their very first provincial championship victory.
 Portaferry win the provincial title for the first time after losing eight previous Ulster deciders.
 Ballyhale Shamrocks win their eighth Leinster title to go one ahead of Birr to lead the all-time provincial roll of honour.

Top scorers

Championship

Single game

References

2014 in hurling
2015 in hurling
All-Ireland Senior Club Hurling Championship